Proctor is a city in Saint Louis County, Minnesota, United States. The population was 3,120 at the 2020 census. The city was established as Proctorknott in 1894, with the name coming from former Kentucky Governor J. Proctor Knott. Knott was famous for delivering the speech The Untold Delights of Duluth to the U.S. House of Representatives. The city's name was shortened to Proctor in 1904.

Proctor's welcome sign on U.S. Highway 2 reads: "You Have a Place in Proctor".

Geography

U.S. Highway 2 and County Road 14 (Boundary Avenue) are two of the main routes in Proctor. Interstate Highway 35 is in close proximity to the city. Other main routes in Proctor include 2nd Street, 2nd Avenue (Lavaque Road), and 5th Street.

Proctor is beside Duluth's Bayview Heights neighborhood, with which it forms something of a contiguous community unit due to Bayview Heights' topographical separation (the hill) from adjacent West Duluth. It is bounded by the city of Hermantown to the north, Midway Township to the west, Bayview Heights to the east, and a mostly undeveloped area of Duluth (officially in the Riverside neighborhood) to the south.

Kingsbury Creek flows through the central Proctor. Knowlton Creek flows through the southeast Proctor.

Transportation

Public transit
 Duluth Transit Authority

Major highways
  U.S. Highway 2
  Interstate 35

Culture
Proctor is the home of the South Saint Louis County Fairgrounds, on Boundary Avenue.

The South Saint Louis County Fair takes place annually the second week of August. Its events include karaoke contests, a teen dance, car show, petting zoo, pony rides, bull riding, carnival rides, 4-H exhibits, horse shows, lumberjack show, and stock car racing.

Auto Racing at the Proctor Speedway takes place at the same location on Sundays from May to October.

The Proctor Hoghead Festival also takes places every August. Hoghead celebrates Proctor's railroad heritage; it has the world's largest inland iron ore sorting facilities. Railroad-oriented events include hand car races, spike driving contests, golden spike treasure hunt, parade, fireworks, mile run (prizes for beating state record), food & craft vendors, games, car show, rib cook-off, street dance, pet parade, softball & golf tourneys, ecumenical church service, kids' games, and community picnic.

The Proctor Area Museum, operated by the Proctor Area Historical Society, features the history of the DM&N/DM&IR Railroad as well as the City of Proctor and its surrounding communities, which make up the Proctor School District. The DM&N was founded in 1891 and in 1930 leased the D&IR's railroad properties in Two Harbors, Minnesota. In 1937 the DM&N merged with the Spirit Lake Transfer Railroad to become the DM&IR. In 1938 the D&IR dissolved and became part of the DM&IR. In 1904 both railroads came under the ownership of the newly formed United States Steel Company. The DM&IR was later sold to the Canadian National Railroad. The museum is building a steam-era interpretive exhibit of the DM&N/DM&IR Railroad featuring an o-gauge model railroad. The Yellowstone 225, one of the world's three remaining Yellowstone steam engines, is on the museum grounds.

Proctor is also the starting point for the Blackwoods Blizzard Tour, an annual snowmobile ride around northern Minnesota that raises money to fight ALS. The ride goes from Proctor up to Tower, over to Two Harbors, and returns to Proctor. Hundreds of people participate, and the organization raises over $1 million every year for ALS research, making it the largest snowmobile fundraiser in the world.

Demographics

2010 census
As of the census of 2010, there were 3,057 people, 1,268 households, and 795 families living in the city. The racial makeup of the city was 96.8% White, 0.2% African American, 1.1% Native American, 0.4% Asian, 0.2% from other races, and 1.3% from two or more races. Hispanic or Latino of any race were 1.2% of the population.

There were 1,268 households, of which 27.4% had children under the age of 18 living with them, 48.8% were married couples living together, 9.6% had a female householder with no husband present, 4.3% had a male householder with no wife present, and 37.3% were non-families. 30.4% of all households were made up of individuals, and 13% had someone living alone who was 65 years of age or older. The average household size was 2.34 and the average family size was 2.90.

The median age in the city was 41.4 years. 20.7% of residents were under the age of 18; 8.2% were between the ages of 18 and 24; 25.5% were from 25 to 44; 29.7% were from 45 to 64; and 16.1% were 65 years of age or older. The gender makeup of the city was 49.3% male and 50.7% female.

2000 census
As of the census of 2000, there were 2,852 people, 1,196 households, and 772 families living in the city. The racial makeup of the city was 96.49% White, 0.14% African American, 1.16% Native American, 0.53% Asian, 0.28% from other races, and 1.40% from two or more races. Hispanic or Latino of any race were 0.74% of the population. 19.8% were of German, 17.9% Norwegian, 10.3% Swedish, 7.3% French, 7.0% Finnish, 6.2% Polish, 6.0% Irish and 5.4% Italian ancestry.

There were 1,196 households, out of which 28.6% had children under the age of 18 living with them, 51.5% were married couples living together, 10.6% had a female householder with no husband present, and 35.4% were non-families. 30.8% of all households were made up of individuals, and 17.1% had someone living alone who was 65 years of age or older.  The average household size was 2.38 and the average family size was 2.99.

In the city, the population was spread out, with 24.0% under the age of 18, 9.4% from 18 to 24, 27.3% from 25 to 44, 23.6% from 45 to 64, and 15.8% who were 65 years of age or older.  The median age was 38 years. For every 100 females, there were 86.6 males.  For every 100 females age 18 and over, there were 85.8 males.

The median income for a household in the city was $38,322, and the median income for a family was $49,875. Males had a median income of $33,583 versus $22,035 for females. The per capita income for the city was $18,851.  About 3.2% of families and 5.0% of the population were below the poverty line, including 5.5% of those under age 18 and 5.9% of those age 65 or over.

Politics

Education 
Proctor's public school district is  ISD 704 (Proctor Public Schools). It encompasses Proctor, Duluth's Bayview Heights neighborhood, and Canosia, Grand Lake, Midway, and Solway townships. ISD 704 operates two elementary schools (Bayview Heights and Pike Lake), Jedlicka Middle School, and Proctor High School.

See also
 U.S. Highway 2
 U.S. Highway 2 in Minnesota
 Interstate 35
 Interstate 35 in Minnesota
 Saint Louis County Road 14 – Boundary Avenue

References

External links
 City of Proctor, MN – Official site
 Proctor Schools site
 Proctor Journal newspaper site
 Proctor Area Chamber of Commerce website
 VisitProctor.com – Official Proctor, MN Travel Guide site

Cities in St. Louis County, Minnesota
Cities in Minnesota